Kimberly Wyant (born February 11, 1964) is an American soccer coach and retired player. She is the head coach of the New York University men's soccer team, currently, one of only two women to lead a men's NCAA National Collegiate Athletic Association soccer program (the other being Julianne Sitch at the University of Chicago). Since her appointment as coach of NYU, she has led them to postseason play in every season except one, including two NCAA National soccer championship tournaments.

She is currently the head coach for the Brooklyn City FC women's soccer team, and also coached the NYAC (New York Athletic Club) to the 2014 United States Adult Soccer Association (USASA) Amateur Women's National Championship.

Wyant was the goalkeeper for the first United States women's national soccer team, appearing in the inaugural US game in Italy in 1985. She played 16 international games for the United States, and was the first goalkeeper for the women's national team and recorded the team's first shutout and win during a match against Canada in July 1986.

In 2008, Wyant was the recipient of the ‘Special Recognition Award’ by the National Soccer Hall of Fame honoring her contribution to the winning way of the Women's National Team.

Playing career
In 1982 Wyant appeared in the first NCAA National Soccer Championship representing the University of Central Florida (UCF) Knights women's team. Despite her team's loss, she was named the Most Valuable Player of the National Championship tournament. Wyant played soccer for UCF from 1982 to 1985,. She was the team's rookie of the year in her freshman year and MVP in her senior year.  In 2010, she was inducted into the UCF Athletic Hall of Fame.

During its first year, the United States women's national soccer team was a hastily collected roster of unknown players There was little practice time, limited equipment to speak of, and unglamorous travel conditions. The season consisted of a trip to Jesolo, Italy where the team played four games, losing to Denmark, England, and Italy, and managing a draw in their rejoinder with Denmark.

Professional 
Wyant is the Long Island Lady Riders all-time leader in minutes played with 8,636 minutes during nine seasons, and second all time in games played with 99. As a leader in defense on the team, she helped lead Long Island to the United Soccer Leagues (USL) W-League National Championships in 1995 and 1997 and a 2–0 victory over the Brazilian Women's National Team in 1999. During her career with the Lady Riders she was the dominant goalkeeper of the W-League, winning Goalkeeper of The Year Honors four consecutive years- 1995, 96, 97, and 98.  She was also honored as the Most Valuable Player for her performance in the 1997 Championship series, and has twice been selected as a W-league All Star.

Shortly after announcing her retirement in August 2003, Wyant was named General Manager of the Lady Riders. Prior to her promotion, Kim implemented the team's very successful camps and youth academy. Under her direction the Lady Riders twice-received the USL W-League ‘Organization of the Year’ awarded annually to the top USL organization displaying excellence both on and off the field. Kim also served as the team interim coach during the 2002 season, leading the team to an 11-1-1 record. In 2004, Kim was inducted into the United Soccer League's Soccer Hall of Fame.

Kim served as the head coach for Florida Atlantic University's women's soccer team from 1995 through 1998, and Dowling College from 2003 to 2006. She served as head coach of the Women's Premier Soccer League (WPSL) New York Athletic Club from 2012-2016. She is currently the men's head coach at New York University(NYU), as well as the General Manager and Head Coach of the Brooklyn City F.C. Women's First Team.

In 1998, she served as a Federation International Football Association (FIFA) Staff Coach in Trinidad, where she instructed national team coaches from the Confederation of North, Central American and Caribbean Association Football (CONCACAF) region on the modern demands of goalkeeping. She is the founder of Above All Goalkeeping camps, and is widely regarded as one of the top goalkeeper coaches in the Southeast.

Wyant is a US Soccer–licensed coach and holds a National Soccer Coaches Association of America (NSCAA) Premier Diploma. She has served as a clinician for many soccer organizations, and has published articles in various newsletters and publications.

BMX career
Wyant was among the first female bicycle motocross BMX’er in the nation. She is one of the pioneers of BMX riders that started a revolution in bicycling that has culminated into an Olympic Sporting event.

Honors
 1982 NCAA National Championship MVP
 1986 NSCAA First Team All American
 1995 & 97 USL W League National Champion (Long Island Lady Riders)
 1995, 96, 97 & 98 USL W League Goalkeeper of the Year
 1997 USL W League Championship MVP
 1997, 1998 USL W League All Star
 1999, 2000 USL Organization of the Year (Long Island Lady Riders)
 2004 USL Hall of Fame Class
 2008 National Soccer Hall of Fame, Special Recognition Award
 2010 UCF Hall of Fame Women's Soccer 
 2013 Long Island Soccer Hall of Fame Class

See also
 1985 United States women's national soccer team

References

Further reading
 Grainey, Timothy (2012), Beyond Bend It Like Beckham: The Global Phenomenon of Women's Soccer, University of Nebraska Press, 
 Lisi, Clemente A. (2010), The U.S. Women's Soccer Team: An American Success Story, Scarecrow Press, 
 Nash, Tim (2016), ''It's Not the Glory: The Remarkable First Thirty Years of US Women's Soccer', Lulu Press,

External links
 NYU coach profile
 U.S. WNT Flashback - 20th Anniversary of First-Ever Match: Kim Wyant (archived)

Living people
American soccer coaches
American women's soccer players
University of Central Florida alumni
1964 births
United States women's international soccer players
UCF Knights women's soccer players
Women's association football goalkeepers
Soccer players from Miami
Sports coaches from Miami
NYU Violets coaches
Long Island Rough Riders (USL W League) players
USL W-League (1995–2015) players